Eupithecia contraria is a moth in the family Geometridae. It is found in Pakistan and Nepal.

References

Moths described in 1983
contraria
Moths of Asia